Aral is a sub-prefecture-level city surrounded by Aksu Prefecture in Xinjiang Uyghur Autonomous Region, China. Aral means "island" in Uyghur. The city's name is often written as Alar.

History 
According to Radio Free Asia, a United States government-funded news service, Aral was created in the 1950s by the Xinjiang Production and Construction Corps to facilitate Han Chinese immigration to the region.

Aral became a city in 2002 and its population increased to 166,205 in 2010.

Geography 
It is bordered by mountainous regions to the north and northwest and the Taklamakan Desert to the east and south.

Demographics
As of 2015, 167,697 (93.6%) of the 179,214 residents of the county were Han Chinese, 6,036 (3.4%) were Uyghur and 5,481 were from other ethnic groups.

Climate

Education 
Tarim University is located in Aral.

See also 
 Aral Talim Airport
 Xinjiang Production and Construction Corps

References 

Populated places in Xinjiang
Xinjiang Production and Construction Corps
County-level divisions of Xinjiang